Jasbir may refer to:

Jasbir Singh Bajaj, Indian Physician and Diabetologist has been conferred with the Padma Vibhushan award
Jasbir Jassi, Punjabi singer and actor
Jasbir Singh, former Indian cricketer and umpire
Jasbir Sandhu, Canadian politician
Jasbir Walia, serving Air Marshal of the Indian Air Force and present AOC-in-C of the Southern Air Command
Jasbir Singh Cheema, Indo-Canadian television personality and politician
Jasbir Puar, U.S.-based queer theorist who is currently an associate professor in the Department of Women's and Gender Studies at Rutgers University